Bangladesh Mahila Parishad (BMP, Women's Council of Bangladesh) is a women's human rights organization that was established on 4 April 1970. After the liberation war, Bangladesh Mahila Parishad was registered under the society act in 1976, in the free Bangladesh. It is supported by Norway.

See also
Mahila Atma Raksha Samiti, MARS, Bengal organisation formed 1942, predecessor of National Federation of Indian Women

References

External links
Official site

Women's organisations based in Bangladesh
Women's rights in Bangladesh
Women's rights organizations